Alberto Arredondo Gutiérrez (August 28, 1912 – April 17, 1968)  was a Cuban journalist and economist.

Biography
The son of Rafael Arredondo and Leonor Gutiérrez Betancourt, Alberto Arredondo Gutiérrez was a journalist and economist born in Havana, Cuba. Arredondo owned the daily newspaper Mañana in Havana and was active in the study of Cuba's economy, focusing especially on agriculture. For several years he was in charge of the economic section of the Cuban newspaper Avance. He was a regular contributor for the Cuban international magazine Bohemia. Arredondo served as head of the Departamento de Economía Interna of the Consejo Nacional de Economía in 1958 and, later, as the Cuban delegate to the VII Inter-American Conference on Agriculture and the VI Conference of the Pan American Institute of Geography and History. He also served as an economic advisor to the Comisión de Fomento Nacional of Cuba and as the director of economic research for the Confederación de Trabajadores del Cuba (CTC).

In Havana, during the 1940s and 1950s, Arredondo was the President of the INRE Review (Review of the National Institute of Economic Reform); Economic Advisor for the National Agricultural Development Industrial Bank of Cuba (BANFAIC), and consultant for BANFAIC's president, Amadeo López Castro. He was also advisor and director of the Central Board of Economy, and economic advisor for the Confederation of Workers of Cuba (CTC, Confederación de Trabajadores de Cuba).

In 1960, Arredondo went into exile. After arriving in the United States, he moved to the Dominican Republic where he was a professor of agricultural economics at the Centro Interamericano de Estudios Económicos y Sociales (CIDES) in Santo Domingo from 1963 to 1964. He later came back to Miami, where he remained active in several professional and political organizations. He also worked as a researcher for the Cuban Economics Research Project at the University of Miami.

Arredondo authored several conference papers, economic studies, and books. Some of his works include El negro en Cuba, ensayo (1939), Blitzkrieg!: facetas de la Alemania actual, según los relatos del alemán Karl Dochtmann (1942), Cuba, tierra indefensa (1945), and La historia secreta del comunismo cubano y sus purgas (1965).

Arredondo died in Miami on April 17, 1968. He was survived by his wife Ela Pantaleón and some of his brothers and sisters (Rafael Arredondo, Armando Arredondo, Carmen Arredondo, Laura Arredondo, Leonor Arredondo de Viada, mother of Cuban-American Economist Luis Viada, and Gabriela Arredondo, mother of Cuban writer Rita Martin.

Publications

Notes and references

External links
 The Alberto Arredondo papers are available at the Cuban Heritage Collection, University of Miami Libraries. The Alberto Arredondo Papers consist primarily of Cuban economic reports and papers prepared by Arredondo or by groups of which he was a part.
 Selected items from the Alberto Arredondo papers are available through the University of Miami Libraries Digital Collections portal.

1912 births
1968 deaths
Cuban emigrants to the United States
Exiles of the Cuban Revolution in the United States

Cuban economists
Cuban essayists
Cuban journalists
Male journalists
20th-century essayists
20th-century journalists